Inniskeen Grattans Gaelic Athletic Club is a Gaelic Athletic Association club, based in Inniskeen, County Monaghan, Ireland. The club participates in both Gaelic football and hurling competitions organized by Monaghan GAA county board. In 2010, the club won its first ever Monaghan Senior Hurling Championship title.

History
Inniskeen Grattans was founded in 1883 and is the oldest GAA club in County Monaghan. It was founded one year before the Gaelic Athletic Association was founded in Thurles. In 1888, the first County Championship was held. The final between Inniskeen Grattans and Carrickmacross Emmets, was won by Inniskeen by 0-7 to 0-0. In August 1888, Inniskeen played Cavan champions Maghera Mac Finns in the first Ulster Senior Football Championship Final in Drogheda which ended in a draw, 0-2 each. Inniskeen won the replay in Drogheda on 9 December by 0-3 to 0-1 making Monaghan the first ever Ulster S.F. champions.

Notable players
 Patrick Kavanagh, poet, novelist

Honours

Football
 Monaghan Senior Football Championships:
 1888, 1905, 1938, 1947, 1948
 Monaghan Intermediate Football Championship: (4)
 1994, 2000, 2005, 2014
 Ulster Intermediate Club Football Championship (1)
 2006
 All-Ireland Intermediate Club Football Championship: (1)
 2006
 Monaghan Junior Football Championship: 
 1983
 Monaghan Junior B Football Championship: 1967, 1994
 Monaghan Minor Football Championship: 1964, 2018
 Owen Ward Cup: 1945, 1947, 1949, 1958
 Fr. Hackett Cup: 1943, 1946, 1947, 1949, 1951, 1959, 1960, 1985, 2000, 2003
 Dr. Ward Cup: 1980, 1981
 Brennan Cup: 1961
 Monaghan Junior C Championship (P. Kieran Cup): 1982, 1983
 Monaghan Junior C League (Crawley Cup): 1999
 Hugh Brady Cup: 1985, 1994, 2004, 2008
 Kerley Cup (Under-21 Football): 1982, 2007
 Treanor Cup (Minor Football): 1980, 1999
 Fr. Maguire Cup (Minor Football League Div.1): 1949, 1964
 Monaghan Minor Football Championship Div. 2: 2003
 Mc Cormack Cup (Under-16 Football, Div. 2): 1980, 1999
 Clancy Cup (Under-15 Football, Div. 1): 1981
 Lee Bros Cup (Under-15 Football, Div. 2): 1984, 1985, 1994, 1999
 McHugh Cup (Under-14 Football, Div. 2): 1978, 1979, 1980, 1987,1999
 McGrane Cup (Under-13 Football, Div. 2): 1996
 Conlon Cup (Under-13 Football Div 2): 1995, 2005(Div. 3)
 Club Players Football League: 1969
 Monaghan Creamery Cup (Under-12 Football, Div. 2): 1978, 1980
 Primary Schools League: Scoil Cholmcille, Blackstaff  – 1975, 1976, 1977, 1981, 1988, 1999.St. Daig’s, Inniskeen – 1991.

Hurling
 Monaghan Senior Hurling Championship: 2010, 2013, 2016
 Monaghan Senior Hurling League: 2006, 2010
 Monaghan Reserve Hurling League: 2004, 2005, 2009
 Monaghan Minor Hurling Shield: 2001, 2004
 Jim O’Rourke Cup: 1999
 Monaghan Under-14 Hurling League: 1997
 Ulster Under-13 Hurling Blitz: 1997
 Monaghan Under-13 Hurling League: 1996, 1997
 Monaghan Under-12 Hurling League: 1995
 Monaghan Under-11 Hurling Blitz: 1994

Further reading
 Frank McNally, 'An Irishman's Diary', P. 15, The Irish Times, Friday, 26 July 2013.

External links
 Club website

Gaelic football clubs in County Monaghan
Hurling clubs in County Monaghan
Gaelic games clubs in County Monaghan